Ivan Guimarães Lins (born  June 16, 1945) is a Latin Grammy-winning Brazilian musician. He has been an active performer and songwriter of Brazilian popular music (MPB) and jazz for over thirty years. His first hit, "Madalena", was recorded by Elis Regina in 1970. "Love Dance", a hit in 1989, is one of the most recorded songs in musical history.

His songs have been covered by Patti Austin, David Benoit, George Benson, Michael Bublé, Eliane Elias, Ella Fitzgerald, Dave Grusin, Shirley Horn, Quincy Jones, Steve Kuhn, the Manhattan Transfer, Sérgio Mendes, Jane Monheit, Mark Murphy, Carmen McRae, Joe Pass, Lee Ritenour, Sarah Vaughan, Diane Schuur, Sting, Barbra Streisand, Take 6, Toots Thielemans, Dan Costa (musician) and Nancy Wilson.

Life
Ivan Lins was born in Ituverava - São Paulo. He spent several years in Boston, Massachusetts, while his father, a naval engineer, continued graduate studies at M.I.T., studied at the Military College in Rio. He later received a degree in industrial chemical engineering from the Federal University of Rio de Janeiro. He considered a career in volleyball before discovering his considerable musical talent. Ivan Lins currently resides in Rio de Janeiro and Lisbon.

Work
Ivan Lins has released albums regularly and penned several standards, such as "Love Dance", "Começar de Novo" (Starting Over) (the English lyric version is titled "The Island", with lyrics by Alan and Marilyn Bergman) and "Velas Içadas", which have made their way north into the American jazz lexicon. "You Moved Me to This", a duet with Brenda Russell from the same album as "Love Dance", saw modest success on American radio. He recorded in English for Reprise/Warner Bros. Records in the early 1990s.

In the mid-eighties, Lins recorded a jazz fusion album with Dave Grusin and Lee Ritenour titled Harlequin, which was a critical and commercial success. Lins also composed the soundtrack for the Brazilian film Dois Córregos.

Lins' longtime composing partner is Vítor Martins. Their songs typically feature lush harmony with a distinctive jazz sensibility. One signature voicing he often employs in his own performances is the delayed addition of a 11 to a sus13 chord, or the delayed addition of a 9 to a sus13 chord.

Lins appeared as a guest performer on the albums Dois Mundos (1998) and Recorded in Rio (2003) by the Dutch artist Josee Koning. He also appeared on the Michael Bublé album Call Me Irresponsible (2007) and with singer/songwriter Paula Cole on her 2007 CD Courage, singing a duet with her on the song "Hard to be Soft". Lins guested on American artist Jane Monheit's album Surrender (2007), which includes his composition "Rio de Maio".

Jazz reporter and music critic David Adler reported Lins's October 2000 Carnegie Hall concert performance and tribute to him. The event corresponded with the tribute album titled A Love Affair, released by Telarc Records. Headline performers from diverse genres participated in celebrating the man and his music on the recording and in the world-class performance hall, a noteworthy accomplishment in the history of any musician.

Lins maintains an active touring schedule, including a 2003 appearance at the Blue Note in New York City. In May 2008 he returned to New York, performing with Rosa Passos at Jazz at Lincoln Center.

Ivan Lins is a political artist and musical icon in his country.

Beyond his own performance of his compositions, Simone is a notable and respected interpreter of his work.

Awards and honors
In 2005, he won two Latin Grammy Awards; Album of the Year and Best MPB (Música popular brasileira) Album for Cantando Histórias. He became the first Brazilian artist and Portuguese-language artist to win the Latin Grammy for Album of the Year. No other Brazilian artist or Portuguese-language artist has won the award since then.

Lins was nominated for three Latin Grammy Awards in 2009 for his latest album, Regência: Vince Mendoza performed with the Metropole Orchestra. He was nominated for Record of the Year (Arlequim Desconhecido) and Album of the Year. He won the award for Best MPB (Música popular brasileira) Album.

In 2015, he was nominated for the 16th Latin Grammy Awards in the Best MPB Album category for his album América Brasil.

Discography
 Agora (1970)
 Deixa O Trem Seguir (1971)
 Quem Sou Eu (1972)
 Modo Livre (1974)
 Chama Acesa (1975)
 Somos Todos Iguais Nesta Noite (1977)
 Começar de novo (1977)
 Nos Dias de Hoje (1978)
 A Noite (1979)
 Novo Tempo (1980)
 Daquilo Que Eu Sei (1981)
 Depois dos Temporais (1983)
 Juntos (album)|Juntos (1984)
 Ivan Lins (album)|Ivan Lins (1986)
 Mãos (1987)
 Love Dance (1988)
 Amar Assim (1989)
 Awa Yiô (1991)
 A Doce Presença de Ivan Lins (1994)
 Anjo de Mim (1995)
 I'm Not Alone (1996)
 Acervo Especial, Vol. 2 (1997)
 Ivan Lins/Chucho Valdés/Irakere/Ao Vivo (1996)
 Viva Noel: Tributo a Noel Rosa Vol. 1 (1997)
 Viva Noel: Tributo a Noel Rosa Vol. 2 (1997)
 Live at MCG (MCG Jazz, 1999)
 Dois Córregos (1999)
 Um Novo Tempo (1998)
 A Cor Do Pôr-Do-Sol (2000)
 Jobiniando (2001)
 Love Songs – A Quem Me Faz Feliz (2002)
 I Love Mpb – Amor (2004)
 Cantando Histórias (2004)
 Acariocando (2006)
 Saudades de Casa (2007)
 Regência: Vince Mendoza (2009)
 Íntimo (2010)
 Perfil (2010)
 Amoragio (2012)
 Intimate en español (2012)
 Cornucopia (2013)
 Believe What I Say (2014)
 Love Dance with Dan Costa (composer) (2020)

References

External links
 Official Web site
 Live performance photographs
 Selected discography

Brazilian composers
Brazilian jazz musicians
1945 births
Living people
Latin music composers
Latin Grammy Award winners
Música Popular Brasileira musicians
Philips Records artists
Reprise Records artists
Warner Music Latina artists
Federal University of Rio de Janeiro alumni
Massachusetts Institute of Technology alumni
Musicians from Rio de Janeiro (city)
20th-century Brazilian musicians
21st-century Brazilian musicians
20th-century composers
21st-century composers